Glam (stylized in all caps) was a South Korean girl group that debuted in 2012 managed by Source Music and produced by Big Hit Entertainment, now known as Big Hit Music. The group originally consisted of five members: Zinni, Trinity, Jiyeon, Dahee, and Miso. They were the first girl group of Source Music and Big Hit Entertainment. The group officially debuted in 2012 with the single “Party XXO”. Glam disbanded in 2015. The name of the group means "Girls be Ambitious".

History

2010–2011: Pre-debut 
Before officially debuting, Glam was featured on 2AM's song "Just Me" from the boy band's 2010 album, Saint o'Clock. Glam and BTS were also featured artists on Lee Hyun's song "Bad Girl" from the singer's 2011 album, You Are Best of My Life. The group also gained spotlight after member Dahee provided the vocals for the VOCALOID3 product SeeU.

In 2012, Glam starred in the reality show, Real Music Drama: GLAM, which aired on SBS MTV from June 6 until the group's official debut.

2012–2013: Debut, digital singles, and Trinity’s departure 
On July 16, 2012, Glam officially debuted with the release of their debut single, "Party (XXO)." Later that year, they released the song, "The Person I Miss" for the soundtrack of the Korean drama, Five Fingers.

On December 31, Source Music and Big Hit Entertainment announced that Trinity was leaving the group due to personal reasons and that Glam would continue as a four-member group.

On January 2, 2013, Glam released their second single, "I Like That" which sampled the song "Why Do You" by Chuli and Miae. On March 15, Glam made their second comeback of the year with the single, "In Front of the Mirror" which combined genres including Europop, trot, and hip hop.

2014–2015: Blackmailing scandal and disbandment
On September 2, 2014, the actor Lee Byung-hun accused two women of blackmailing him by using a compromising video as leverage. On January 15, 2015, the Seoul District Court sentenced Dahee to one year in prison. The same day, Glam's agency confirmed that the members of the group had ended their contracts with the agency, and the group had officially disbanded.

On March 26, 2015, the Seoul District Court, under Lee Byung-hun's request, gave Dahee a two-year suspended sentence instead of 1-year prison sentence.

Discography

Singles

Soundtrack appearances

Collaborations

Filmography

Television

References

K-pop music groups
Musical groups established in 2012
Musical groups disestablished in 2015
South Korean dance music groups
South Korean girl groups
2012 establishments in South Korea